The 2014 Internationale Jänner Rallye was the first round of the 2014 European Rally Championship season, held in Austria between 3–5 January 2014.

The rally was won by ex-Formula One driver and WRC-2 champion Robert Kubica and co-driver Maciej Szczepaniak.

Results

References

2014 in Austrian motorsport
2014 European Rally Championship season
Jänner Rallye